Kuzbass Kemerovo  is a Russian professional men's volleyball team, based in Kemerovo, playing in Super League since 2010.

Achievements 
Domestic competitions
 Russian Super League 
Winners (1):  2019
3rd place (1):  2020
 Russian Cup
Runners-up (2):  2011, 2017
 Russian Super Cup
Winners (1):  2019

Team Roster
Team roster – season 2021/2022

Notable players
Notable, former or current players of club, who are medalist of intercontinental tournaments in national teams or clubs.

  Samuel Tuia
  Earvin N'Gapeth
  Ivan Zaytsev (volleyball)
  Petar Krsmanović
  Aleksey Obmochaev
  Igor Kobzar
  Evgeny Sivozhelez
  Viktor Poletaev
  Dmitry Ilinikh
  Maksim Zhigalov
  Konstantin Ushakov

External links
Official site

Russian volleyball clubs
Sport in Kemerovo